Salisbury Composite High School, often referred to as Sal or Sal Comp, is a public high school located in Sherwood Park, Alberta, Canada. It is part of Elk Island Public Schools Regional Division No. 14.

History

Salisbury Composite High School was founded in 1953. In June 1954, ten teachers organized the school's first graduation ceremony for 27 students. In the Fall of 1969, "Salisbury" became Salisbury Composite High School with a move to its present location in Sherwood Park and the opening of its vocational department.

Salisbury's motto is Sic Sursum, which means "sail on" (literal Latin translation: "thus upwards"). The school logo consists of a sailing ship with Salisbury's motto. Salisbury's colours are red, black and white, and the various sports teams are known as the Sabres.

Salisbury's crest consists of a large "S" in front of crossed sabres. The sabres point skywards in a salute to victory.

Athletics

Sabres teams represent Salisbury in the following sports:
 Badminton
 Basketball
 Cheer
 Cross Country
 Football
 Golf
 Rugby
 Soccer
 Swimming
 Track and Field
 Handball
 Volleyball

Clubs
Clubs at Salisbury include
 Indigenous Youth and Allies Circle
 German Exchange
 Debate and Model UN
 Yearbook
 Esports: Competitive E-sports Teams for League of Legends and Super Smash Brothers
 Robotics
 GSA (Gender and Sexuality Alliance)
 Movement
 Video Game Club

Notable alumni
 Mike Johnson, Former MLB player (Baltimore Orioles, Montreal Expos)
 Kelsey Mitchell, Olympic sprint track cycling gold-medalist. She is pictured prominently on the Sabre Athletics Legacy Wall within the school.

References

International Baccalaureate Organization - Salisbury Composite High School
Sherwood Park Public Schools History
2006 ASAA Provincial Football Results
Sabres Football Page
Salisbury Student Clubs

High schools in Alberta
International Baccalaureate schools in Alberta
Sherwood Park
Educational institutions established in 1953
1953 establishments in Alberta